Raimonds Staprans (Latvian: Raimonds Staprāns) is a well-known artist and playwright both in the United States and his native Latvia.  Staprans was born in 1926 in Riga, Latvia.  He now lives in San Francisco, California with his wife, scientist Ilona Staprāns. He has two daughters, Maretta Staprāns-Barlow and Alda Staprāns-Mednis.

After living in occupied Latvia and in a Displaced Persons camp during World War II, Staprans immigrated to the United States with his family in 1947.  He studied art at the University of Washington under Alexander Archipenko and Mark Tobey, then moved to the San Francisco Bay Area to begin graduate studies at the University of California, Berkeley.  He studied with Hans Hofmann and Karl Kasten, among others, and graduated with a Masters of Fine Arts in 1954.  Staprans began exhibiting his art in the Maxwell Galleries in San Francisco.  He currently exhibits at the Hackett | Mill Gallery in San Francisco  and at the Peter Mendenhall Gallery in Los Angeles.

Staprans' work is held in the permanent collections in the Fine Arts Museums of San Francisco, the Los Angeles County Museum of Art, the San Jose Museum of Art, and the Portland Art Museum, among others.  A career retrospective of his art opened at the Pasadena Museum of California Art in March, 2006, was shown at the Hackett-Freedman Gallery  and traveled to Riga, Latvia where it was exhibited in the Latvian National Museum of Art later that year.  A 60-year retrospective exhibit entitled "Full Spectrum: Paintings by Raimonds Staprans," opened in June, 2017 at the Crocker Art Museum in Sacramento, California and then moved to the San Jose Museum of Art in San Jose, California in February, 2018.

Staprans' skillfully constructed still life and landscape paintings are notable for the artist's sensitive response to light and color.  A recent review of his work exhibited in Los Angeles compared the "tasteful seriousness" of his paintings to that of Cézanne. Staprans is said to examine the "architecture" of everyday objects in his art using explosive color and flattened compositions, creating a "tension between representation and abstraction that plays with viewers' expectations."

Staprans is also an accomplished playwright.  Most of his plays are set in Latvia during the 20th century.  His play "The Freezing" was produced in 1979 by the San Francisco Little Theater and the Latvian National Theater in 1980.  His 1989 play, "Four Days in June", depicted the Soviet occupation of Latvia in 1940.  It was performed in Riga to more than 100 sold-out audiences, and later won first prize in the Baltic Theatre Festival. "Four Days in June" is regarded as having played an integral part in the pro-democracy movement in Latvia during the momentous changes following the end of the Soviet Union.

In 2003, Staprans was awarded Latvia's highest civilian honor, the Order of the Three Stars, the Latvian equivalent of the United States Presidential Medal of Freedom.

An extensive interview with Raimonds Staprans was conducted by the Archives of American Art, Smithsonian Institution, by Paul Karlstrom in 1997.  Karlstrom later published a fully illustrated book entitled "Raimonds Staprans:  Art of Tranquility and Turbulence".

References

Further reading 
Shields, Scott A. and Pagel, David.  Full Spectrum: Paintings By Raimonds Staprans, 2017
Ansone, Elita. Way Too Many Unruly Oranges, Diena, December 5, 2003
Avens, Voldemārs. About the Painter Raimonds Staprāns, Jaunā Gaita 216  March, 1999
Karlstrom, Paul J. "Control and Sensuality: The Realist Abstraction of Raimonds Staprans" in Raimonds Staprans: Recent Work.  Catalogue.  San Francisco, California: Hackett-Freedman Gallery, 2001.
Landauer, Susan, William H. Gerdts, and Patricia Trenton.  The Not-So-Still-Life: A Century of California Painting and Sculpture Berkeley: University of California Press and San Jose, California: San Jose Museum of Art, 2003.
Landauer, Susan.  The Lighter Side of Bay Area Figuration Kansas City:  Kemper Museum of Contemporary Art, 2000.
Mendenhall, Peter.  Raimonds Staprans  Pasadena, California:  Mendenhall Gallery, 1998.

Selected exhibitions 
February–May 2018 San Jose Museum of Art, San Jose
June–October 2017 Crocker Art Museum, Sacramento
2016 Latvian National Museum of Art, Riga, Latvia
April 2013  Peter Mendenhall Gallery, Los Angeles
April 2011  Hackett Mill Gallery, San Francisco
March, 2009 Hackett-Freedman Gallery, San Francisco
2008 Peter Mendenhall Gallery, Los Angeles;
2006 State Museum of Art, Riga, Latvia; Hackett-Freedman Gallery, San Francisco; Pasadena Museum of California Art, Pasadena;
2003–2004 Hackett-Freedman Gallery, San Francisco;
2001 Hackett-Freedman Gallery, San Francisco;
1999 Mendenhall Gallery, Beverly Hills;
1998 Maxwell Galleries, San Francisco;
1997 Kunstmesse, Cologne; Galerie Redmann, Berlin; Mendenhall Gallery, Pasadena;
1996 Maxwell Galleries, San Francisco; Mendenhall Gallery, Pasadena;
1994 Marburg Art Center, Marburg, Germany; Galerie Redmann, Berlin; Maxwell Galleries, San Francisco;
1993 Galerie Redmann, Berlin.

1926 births
Living people
Artists from Riga
Writers from Riga
Latvian emigrants to the United States
Latvian World War II refugees
University of Washington alumni
University of California, Berkeley alumni